Parmena sericata is a species of beetle in the family Cerambycidae. It was described by Sama in 1996. It is known from Turkey. It feeds on Castanea sativa.

References

Parmenini
Beetles described in 1996